Puzha is a 1980 Indian Malayalam film, directed by Jeassy. The film stars Sukumari, Srividya, Manavalan Joseph and Sankaradi in the lead roles. The film has a musical score by M. K. Arjunan.

Cast
M. G. Soman 
Ravikumar 
Alummoodan 
Manavalan Joseph 
Sankaradi 
Sukumari 
Srividya 
Ambika 
Meena 
Reena

Soundtrack
The music was composed by M. K. Arjunan and the lyrics were written by P. Bhaskaran.

Accolades
1980 Filmfare Award for Best Actress – Malayalam  - Srividya

References

External links
 

1980 films
1980s Malayalam-language films